David Ganz may refer to:

 David Ganz (palaeographer) (born 1952), British academic
 David Ganz (art historian) (born 1970), German academic